Hampsonicola is a monotypic genus of moths of the family Noctuidae.

References

Xyleninae
Monotypic moth genera